St. Margarets Bay is a community of the Halifax Regional Municipality in the Canadian province of Nova Scotia.

Climate

References
Explore HRM

Communities in Halifax, Nova Scotia
General Service Areas in Nova Scotia